Andrew D. Hevesi (born November 19, 1973) is a Democratic member of the New York State Assembly representing the 28th Assembly District, which includes Forest Hills, Rego Park, Richmond Hill, Glendale, Kew Gardens, Ridgewood, and Middle Village.

Early life and family
Hevesi is the son of former New York State Comptroller Alan Hevesi, and the brother of former New York State Senator Daniel Hevesi.

Andrew Hevesi held several public service positions before being elected to the New York State Assembly, including a period in both the Queens District Attorney's office and as Director of Community Affairs for Public Advocate Betsy Gotbaum. Hevesi also served as Chief of Staff for former New York State Senator Jeff Klein.

Hevesi has a BA degree in political science from Queens College. He married Rachel Ross in 2007. The couple have a daughter, and live in Forest Hills, New York.

Political career

On May 10, 2005, Hevesi won a special election to fill a seat left vacant by the resignation of former Assemblyman Michael Cohen, serving for the remainder of his term. In 2007, New York State and Albany County investigators examined whether Hevesi and his brother improperly reaped benefits from their disgraced father's control of the state’s $154 billion pension fund. At the time, more than a tenth of Hevesi's contributions had come from investment firms that managed state pension fund assets or their executives, including Los Angeles-based Republican fundraiser Elliott Broidy. Hevesi was re-elected in November 2006 and has been re-elected in all subsequent elections.

From June 2011 to February 2015 Assemblyman Hevesi served as Chairman of the Committee on Oversight, Analysis, and Investigation, a position previously held by both New York City Comptroller Scott Stringer and New York State Senate President Pro Tempore Jeff Klein. As Chair, Assemblyman Hevesi held hearings on numerous topics including healthcare, human trafficking, and technology infrastructure in New York State.

Hevesi has secured a total of $6 million for freight locomotive engine upgrades in the 2013–2014 and 2014–2015 New York State Budgets. The initiative was prompted by a constituency in his district that suffered from constant locomotive idling and emissions from outdated locomotive engines.

In February 2015, Assemblyman Hevesi was appointed Chairman of the Committee on Social Services.

Election results
 May 2005 special election, NYS Assembly, 28th AD

{| class="Wikitable"
| Andrew D. Hevesi (DEM – WOR) || ... || 4,188
|-
| Anthony Como (REP – IND – CON) || ... || 2,817
|}

 November 2006 general election, NYS Assembly, 28th AD
{| class="Wikitable"
| Andrew D. Hevesi (DEM – WOR) || ... || 14,790
|-
| Dolores Maddis (REP – CON) || ... || 5,653
|}

 November 2008 general election, NYS Assembly, 28th AD
{| class="Wikitable"
| Andrew D. Hevesi (DEM – WOR) || ... || 24,255
|-
| Walter E. Schmidt (REP) || ... || 8,948
|}

 November 2010 general election, NYS Assembly, 28th AD
{| class="Wikitable"
| Andrew D. Hevesi (DEM – WOR) || ... || 14,237
|-
| Aleksander P. Powietrzynski (REP – CON) || ... || 7,578
|-
| Joseph E. Tiraco (IND) || ... || 1,017
|}

References

External links

"Hevesi Worries on Maspeth Incubation", nydailynews.com; March 1, 2011.

1973 births
Living people
American people of Hungarian-Jewish descent
Jewish American state legislators in New York (state)
Democratic Party members of the New York State Assembly
People from Forest Hills, Queens
Queens College, City University of New York alumni
21st-century American politicians
21st-century American Jews